Bower Lewis Thrower Architects, Ltd. (BLTa) is an American architectural firm, founded and headquartered in Philadelphia, Pennsylvania, with offices in Atlantic City and Las Vegas. The firm has designed, overseen the renovation, or been the architect of record for numerous projects throughout the Mid-Atlantic states.

Company background
BLTa was founded as "Bower & Fradley Architects" in 1961 by John Bower and Fred Fradley. In 1978, the firm was renamed to "Bower Fradley Lewis Thrower Architects." The firm kept this name until 1980 when the title changed to "Bower Lewis Thrower Architects." This was shortened in the late 2000s to BLTa for marketing purposes.

People
Michael L. Prifti, FAIA, Principal
Eric M. Rahe, AIA, LEED AP, Principal

Notable projects

Residential
 International House Philadelphia(1970) under Bower & Fradley Architects 
 101 Walnut Street (2007)
 Symphony House (2007)
 The Phoenix (2002)
 Venice Lofts (2007)
 Alexander (2018)
Lincoln Square (2019)
Nipper Building

Hospitality
 The Borgata Hotel Casino and Spa (2003)
 Loews Philadelphia Hotel (2000)
 Reading Terminal Headhouse Marriott (1997)
 Revel Resort and Casino (2012) (with Arquitectonica)
 The Bourse
 Caesars Atlantic City Hotel
 The St. James (assistant architects)

Mixed use and retail
 Amtrak 30th Street Station Rail Yard (2004)
 DC USA (2008)
 The Borgata Hotel and Spa Retail Piazza
 One Theater Square, Newark
 Forrestal Village, Princeton University

Parking and intermodal
 Amtrak 30th Street Station Parking Garage (2004)
 Philadelphia International Airport Garage (2003)
 Suburban Station (2006)
 UPENN Module 6 Utility Plant and Garage (1995)

Office
 FMC Tower at Cira Centre South (with Pelli Clarke Pelli)
 Duane Morris Headquarters (2005)
 Tower Bridge Corporate Campus (2000)

Awards and recognition
2011
Top 50 Hotel Design Firms - Building Design+Construction
Top 100 Architecture Firms - Building Design+Construction
No. 142, Top 200 Architecture Firms - Architectural Record
No. 27, Top Design Firms, HA+D Magazine
IDP Firm Award - The Intern Development Program Advisory Committee (IDPAC)
1970
Gold Medal (American Institute of Architects Philadelphia) for International House

References

External links
BLT Architects

Architecture firms based in Pennsylvania
Companies based in Philadelphia